The Dorchester station group is a small station group of two railway stations in Dorchester, Dorset consisting of Dorchester South and Dorchester West. The station group is printed on national rail tickets as DORCHESTER STNS.

Stations
Dorchester South is the town's busiest and most centrally located. It is served by trains on the South West Main Line from Weymouth to London via Bournemouth, it receives the greatest number of services of either of Dorchester's stations. The station and all services are provided by South Western Railway and is accessed from Copper Street.

Dorchester West is a smaller and quieter station, located on the Heart of Wessex Line from Weymouth to Bristol via Westbury. It is accessed from Damers Road, all services and the station are provided by Great Western Railway.

Connections
Tickets marked as DORCHESTER STNS may be used to exit the railway network at any of the two stations. There is no direct rail service between the two stations and a short foot transfer is the only option. To move between West and South station by rail, impractically, passengers would have to travel to Weymouth or Upwey. Passengers who need to connect between the Heart of Wessex and South West Mainlines are advised to change at Upwey or Weymouth unless they wish to traverse the distance between the stations on foot.

External links
Station information for South station from South Western Railway
Station information for West station from First Great Western